François Delattre (born 15 November 1963) is a French diplomat and senior civil servant who has been serving as France’s Ambassador to Germany since 2022. 

From 2019 to 2022, Delattre served as Secretary General of the Ministry of Europe and Foreign Affairs under ministers Jean-Yves Le Drian and Catherine Colonna. He previously was France's ambassador to the United States from 2011 to 2014 and permanent representative to the United Nations in New York City and head of France's UN mission from 2014 until 2019.

Early life and education
Delattre graduated from Sciences Po in Paris in 1984 and the École nationale d'administration with a degree in international law in 1989.

Career
Delattre joined the French Foreign Ministry in 1989, he served at the French embassy to Germany, and in the Department of Strategic Affairs and Disarmament.
Delattre was Press and Communications Director at the French Embassy in Washington, D.C., from 1998 to 2002; Deputy Director of Foreign Minister Dominique de Villepin's Office from 2002 to 2004; French Consul General in New York City from 2004 to 2008; and Ambassador of France to Canada from 2008 to 2011.

Delattre was the Ambassador of France to the United States until 14 June 2014, an appointment made in February 2011 by President Nicolas Sarkozy.

Delattre was appointed to the position of Permanent Representative of France to the United Nations in New York and head of France's UN mission by French president François Hollande on 12 June 2014 with effect from 15 July 2014.

Other activities

Corporate boards
 Orano, Independent Member of the Board of Directors (since 2020)

Non-profit organizations
 École nationale d'administration (ENA), Ex-Officio Member Board of Directors (since 2019)
 Institute of Advanced Studies in National Defence (IHEDN), Member of the Board of Directors
 United Nations International School (UNIS), Honorary Trustee (2014–2019)

References

External links
France, Newfoundland sign driver-licensing pact
Rabbi Arthur Schneier Presented With Legion of Honor Medal by François Delattre, France’s Ambassador to the United States
French Ambassador François Delattre visited Atlanta for the first time on May 26-27 
French Ambassador to the US François Delattre Speaks about Libya on CNN

1963 births
Living people
People from Saint-Marcellin, Isère
Sciences Po alumni
École nationale d'administration alumni
Permanent Representatives of France to the United Nations
Ambassadors of France to Canada
Ambassadors of France to the United States
Chevaliers of the Légion d'honneur
20th-century French diplomats
21st-century French diplomats